Brawley is a surname of Scottish, Irish and English origin. In Scotland and Ireland it may derive from the Irish name Ó Brolaigh, which is also anglicised as Brolly and is common in County Londonderry, Northern Ireland. In England it may also derive from the French name de Broglie. Another possible etymology of the name in Scotland connects it with the Scots word braw, meaning fine or handsome and the word lea, meaning a meadow; compare also the Scots word brawlie meaning excellent or in good health.

The name is most common in Scotland, prominently in Strathclyde, excluding Argyll and Bute and Inverclyde.

Notable people with the surname include:

Benjamin Griffith Brawley (1882-1939), American writer and educator
Billy Brawley, Scottish footballer
Ed Brawley, American football player
Edward A. Brawley, Scottish writer and professor
Edward M. Brawley, American educator and minister
Harry Brawley, American athlete
Joel Brawley, American mathematician
M. A. Brawley, American politician
Otis Brawley, American physician
Robert Brawley, American politician 
Robert J. Brawley, American artist
Ryan Brawley, Scottish boxer
Sean Brawley, American tennis player
Sean Brawley, Australian historian
Susan Brawley, American marine ecologist
Tawana Brawley, a black 15-year-old female who falsely claimed to have been raped by six white men
Wendy Brawley, American politician
William Brawley (disambiguation)

References